Johnny Ray Gill (born 1984) is an American stage and screen actor.

Early life
Gill grew up in Portland, Oregon, and graduated from Jefferson High School in 2002.  He attended the University of Southern California for one year before transferring to Temple University where he completed his bachelor's degree in theatre.  He received his M.F.A. from the University of California, San Diego's graduate acting program.

Filmography

References

External links
 

1985 births
Living people
21st-century American male actors
African-American male actors
American male stage actors
American male television actors
Jefferson High School (Portland, Oregon) alumni
Male actors from Portland, Oregon
Temple University alumni
University of California, San Diego alumni
University of Southern California alumni
21st-century African-American people
20th-century African-American people
African-American history of Oregon